Herpetogramma submarginalis is a moth in the family Crambidae. It was described by Charles Swinhoe in 1901. It is found on Borneo.

References

Moths described in 1901
Herpetogramma
Moths of Asia